Teghut is a village in the Dilijan Municipality of the Tavush Province of Armenia.

References

External links 
World Gazeteer: Armenia – World-Gazetteer.com

Populated places in Tavush Province